Conasprella elegans is a species of sea snail, a marine gastropod mollusk in the family Conidae, the cone snails and their allies.

Like all species within the genus Conasprella, these snails are predatory and venomous. They are capable of "stinging" humans, therefore live ones should be handled carefully or not at all.

Subspecies
 Conasprella elegans elegans (G. B. Sowerby III, 1895) (synonym: Conus elegans elegans G. B. Sowerby III, 1895)
 Conasprella elegans ramalhoi (Coomans, Moolenbeek & Wils, 1986) (synonym: Conus elegans ramalhoi Coomans, Moolenbeek & Wils, 1986)

Description
The size of the shell varies between 18 mm and 40 mm.

Distribution
This marine species occurs from Somalia to Pakistan; and off Western Australia.

References

 Sowerby, G. B., III. 1895. Descriptions of nine new species of shells. Proceedings of the Malacological Society of London 1(5):214–217, pl. 13.
  Puillandre N., Duda T.F., Meyer C., Olivera B.M. & Bouchet P. (2015). One, four or 100 genera? A new classification of the cone snails. Journal of Molluscan Studies. 81: 1–23

External links
 The Conus Biodiversity website
 Cone Shells – Knights of the Sea
 

elegans
Gastropods described in 1895